Dover's Hill is a  hill in the Cotswolds area of central England. Dover's Hill and the surrounding land is the property of The National Trust.

On the top of the hill is a trig point, and also a toposcope illustrating many of the landmarks that are visible from it.

A monument of 1934 commemorates Robert Dover, founder of the Cotswold Olimpick Games, precursor of the
modern Olympic Games.

References

External links

 Official National Trust Dover's Hill webpage

Hills of Gloucestershire
Cotswolds
Mountains and hills of the United Kingdom with toposcopes